DIG is an educational resource in York, England, owned by the York Archaeological Trust, which aims to increase understanding of archaeology and related matters.

DIG is based in St Saviour's Church, one of York's medieval churches, which became redundant in the 1950s. It was acquired by the Trust in 1975. Between 1990 and 2005, the building was called the Archaeological Resource Centre. In April 2006, it reopened as DIG.

Activities in which visitors can engage include:

Discovering techniques used by field archaeologists
Investigating scientific techniques used by archaeologists
Finding out about current archaeological digs and viewing recent finds
Learning more about the history of York

References

External links

Tourist attractions in York
York Archaeological Trust
Archaeological sites in North Yorkshire
Museums in York
Archaeological museums in England